Subdural effusion refers to an effusion in the subdural space, usually of cerebrospinal fluid.

It is sometimes treated with surgery.

See also
 Cerebrospinal fluid leak

References

External links 

Neurological disorders